The glabella, in humans, is the area of skin between the eyebrows and above the nose. The term also refers to the underlying bone that is slightly depressed, and joins the two brow ridges. It is a cephalometric landmark that is just superior to the nasion.

Etymology
The term for the area is derived from the Latin , meaning 'smooth, hairless'.

In medical science
The skin of the glabella may be used to measure skin turgor in suspected cases of dehydration by gently pinching and lifting it. When released, the glabella of a dehydrated patient tends to remain extended ("tented"), rather than returning to its normal shape.

See also 
 Glabellar reflex

References

Bones of the head and neck